Myrtle Hill may refer to:

In the United Kingdom
Myrtle Hill, a location in Myddfai community, Wales

In the United States

Boligee Hill, near  Boligee, Alabama, listed on the National Register of Historic Places (NRHP), now known as Myrtle Hill
Myrtle Hill Cemetery, Rome, Georgia, a site of The 1793 Battle of Hightower, NRHP-listed
 Myrtle Hill (Owingsville, Kentucky), NRHP-listed
Myrtle Hill Plantation House, Gloster, Louisiana, NRHP-listed